Krimmeri-Meinau station is the last passenger station before the German border on the Appenweier–Strasbourg railway line. Both sides being within the Schengen Area, no passport or border controls apply.

The station is situated in the  quarter of Strasbourg.  The station is served by regional trains (TER Grand Est) to Strasbourg and Offenburg.

See also 

 List of SNCF stations in Grand Est

References

Railway stations in France opened in 2003
Railway stations in Bas-Rhin